William Mercer Lennox (August 8, 1900 – October 7, 1991) was a Democratic politician from Philadelphia who served as sheriff from 1952 to 1972.

Lennox was born in Philadelphia in 1900, the son of Robert Lennox and his wife, Theresa Howarth Lennox. At the age of 17, he enlisted in the United States Navy and served in the First World War. After the war, he worked as the business manager of athletics at the University of Pennsylvania. In 1928, Lennox married Kathryn Kilgallen, with whom he had five children, Nancy, William, Jane, Mary Ellen and Benedict.

In 1950, Democratic ward leaders nominated Lennox for Philadelphia City Council in a special election that followed the death of Charles E. O'Halloran. He won and served the remained of the term, which ended in 1952. In 1951, instead of running for another term on the council, Lennox ran for sheriff and won. He was reelected in 1955, 1959, 1963, and 1967. After his fifth term, Lennox retired from office at age 71, but remained active in the community, working as a volunteer at St. John's Hospice in Center City. He died in 1991.

References

Sources

See also
List of members of Philadelphia City Council from 1920 to 1952
1980 interview with Lennox

1900 births
1991 deaths
20th-century American politicians
Philadelphia City Council members
Pennsylvania Democrats
Sheriffs of Philadelphia
United States Navy sailors